Holsworthotrema is a genus of trematodes in the family Opecoelidae.

Species
Holsworthotrema chaoderma Martin, Huston, Cutmore & Cribb, 2018
Holsworthotrema enboubalichthys Martin, Huston, Cutmore & Cribb, 2018

References

Opecoelidae
Plagiorchiida genera